Wyoming Highway 78 (WYO 78) is a  long Wyoming state highway located in Carbon County in the city of Rawlins. The highway runs along a portion of South Higley Boulevard.

Route description
Wyoming Highway 78, albeit short in length, serves as a connection between Highway 71, Interstate 80, and U.S. Route 30 at exit 214, and the Wyoming State Penitentiary to the south. Highway 78 begins at the Wyoming State Penitentiary south of Rawlins, and heads north along South Higley Boulevard. Highway 78 intersects I-80 / US 30 at exit 214, and just  later terminates at Highway 71.

Mileposts increase from north to south along Highway 78.

Major intersections

See also
 U.S. Route 287, which carries the name North Higley Boulevard in Rawlins

References

 Official 2003 State Highway Map of Wyoming

External links 

 Wyoming State Routes 000-099
 WYO 78 - Wyoming State Penitentiary to I-80/US 30
 WYO 78 - I-80/US 30 to WYO 71
 City of Rawlins website
 Wyoming State Penitentiary

Transportation in Carbon County, Wyoming
078